West Adelaide Football Club is an Australian rules football club in the South Australian National Football League (SANFL). Commonly known as The Bloods and Westies, the club's home base is Richmond Oval (currently known as Hisense Stadium under a sponsorship agreement). The Oval is located in Richmond, an inner-western suburb of Adelaide.

The club has won nine SANFL premierships, the most recent coming in 2015 – breaking a thirty-two-year premiership drought dating back to 1983; the second longest in the SANFL.

Club history

Early years (1897–1907)
West Adelaide was formed in 1892, adopting magenta and white as their colours and the club played in the Adelaide and Suburban Association from 1892 to 1896. Wests won the Adelaide and Suburban Association premierships in 1895 and 1896 and following the club's annual general meeting on 30 March 1897, the club applied to join the South Australian Football Association (SAFA) which was approved by 6 votes to 4 against at a meeting held on 5 April 1897.  The SAFA would subsequently become the SANFL.

Upon entering the SAFA, West Adelaide changed their colours to black and red, the colours previously worn by the defunct Old Adelaide Football Club and moved its training headquarters from the South to the West Parklands. The club often struggled to field a full team in its early years as clubs were then controlled by wealthy businessmen and it was no secret that players were regularly poached from less wealthy clubs. West Adelaide was one of the "poor" clubs and consequently won only one of its first 31 matches.

From the 1899 season the SAFA introduced district football in which players had to play for the club in the district where they lived. West Adelaide immediately gained the services of one of the best players of the time, "Bunny" Daly who threw himself into developing the club. Nonetheless, the club still struggled and had won only twenty and drawn two of 127 games by the end of 1907, including a second winless season in 1906. However, with a number of young players such as Richard "Dick" Head joining veterans James Tierney. West's fortunes were about to change and the club would enter what is known as its "Golden Era"

Golden era (1908 - 1913)

Prior to the 1908 season, West Adelaide never finished higher than fifth on the premiership ladder. In 1908 former Hotham 1887-1888 Captain, South Adelaide and North Adelaide champion "Dinny" Reedman became West's Coach. West Adelaide not only became SANFL premiers for the first time defeating Norwood in the Grand Final at the Adelaide Oval but they also became Champions of Australia when they defeated powerful Victorian Football League team Carlton by five goals at the Adelaide Oval. James "Sorry" Tierney was the club's first ever winner of the Magarey Medal in 1908.

West Adelaide repeated as SANFL premiers in 1909 after defeating Port Adelaide by a goal in the Grand Final while "Dick" Head won the club's second Magarey Medal. The club slumped in 1910 to finish in fifth place before repeating their 1908 double success by winning the 1911 SANFL Premiership defeating Port Adelaide in the Grand Final and Essendon to win the Championship of Australia.

The club won its fourth premiership in five years in 1912 after again defeating Port Adelaide in the grand final before finishing their Golden Era with a third placing in 1913.

Between wars
After the SANFL resumed competition following World War I, West Adelaide would finish second in 1922, losing the Final to Norwood while player Robert Barnes was the club's third Magarey Madalist.

Bruce McGregor became the club's fourth Magarey Madalist when he won the award in 1926

The club began playing their home games at the Wayville Showgrounds in 1927 and the club won its fifth premiership by defeating North Adelaide by two goals in the grand final. Captain-Coach Bruce McGregor would not only lead his team to the premiership in 1927 but became the first (and so far only) West Adelaide player to win back to back Magarey Madals. Robert Snell (1929), Jack Sexton (1931) and Ray McArthur (1939) also won the Magarey Medal while playing for the West Adelaide Football Club.

After finishing third in 1928 and 1929 followed by – in the absence of star goalsneak "Dickie" Bennetts who was banned for three years for kicking an umpire – fifth in 1930, West Adelaide slumped badly in 1931 to last with only two wins before bouncing back to fifth in 1932 only half a game from the finals. Despite Bennetts' return, they finished winless for the third time in 1933 but were terribly unlucky in losing five games by a goal or less They recovered to win eight games and draw one in 1934, but between 1935 and 1940 were never higher than seventh in an eight-team competition and overall won only 26 and drew one of 102 games. An unexpected 112-point thrashing of North Adelaide in their last game of 1940, however, proved a true omen of what was to come in 1941. The Bloods carried all before them early in the season and after ten games had suffered only a draw and two narrow losses. A slump ensued before the club required to finish third and beat Port Adelaide in the first semi before Sturt knocked the inexperienced Bloods out in the preliminary.

Between 1942 and 1945 West Adelaide joined forced with Glenelg in a wartime competition, finishing second, third and fourth in a four-team competition.

"Thereabouts" but never "there"
West Adelaide became one of the power teams in the SANFL following the resumption of full-scale competition in 1945. The club finished third in 1946 before winning its sixth premiership in 1947 defeating Norwood 10.15 (75) to 8.15 (63). One of Wests leading players during this time was future SANFL legend Fos Williams who played 54 games for the club between 1946 and 1949 before moving on to captain-coach Port Adelaide in 1950, a move that would haunt West Adelaide for the next thirteen seasons as Wests would lose five Grand Finals, all by less than three goals, to the Williams-coached Port Adelaide between 1954 and 1962.

During the mid-1950s, West Adelaide, under the coaching of Laurie Cahill and with strong players such as Neil Kerley, Brian Faehse, Doug Thomas, Ken Eustice, Ken McGregor and 1957 Magarey Madalist Ron Benton, became regular finals visitors and finished as beaten grand finalists in 1954, losing the grand final to the Fos Williams led Port Adelaide by just three points. The 1954 final was marred by a brawl which broke out at half time of the match when angry Port supporters set upon Wests players as they attempted to enter the dressing room located in the Sir Edwin Smith Stand. This was a reaction to a heavy but legal clash prior to the end of the half between Wests captain Brian Faehse and Ports Dave Boyd in which Boyd had come off second best. Wests had been leading by 25 points at half time but the melee in the crowd proved unsettling with some battered Wests players not making it back to the dressing room until the team was due to go back out onto the oval for the second half. Port came back to trail by only two points going into the last quarter of the game and snatched victory by three points.

The half-time melee was the main topic of discussion at an SANFL meeting following the game which prompted the building of the underground dressing rooms at the Adelaide Oval during the summer of 1954/55 while leaving the rooms in the stands to the cricketers. West Adelaide and their captain Brian Faehse were given the honour of being the first team to use the new rooms and to run out onto the oval from them at the start of the 1955 SANFL season.

Wests finished a disappointing seventh in 1955, but would return to form in 1956 where they would again be beaten grand finalists, again losing to Port. After finishing third in 1957, West Adelaide would play in both the 1958 and 1959 SANFL Grand Finals and again would be beaten by the Fos Williams coached Port Adelaide by just two points in 1958 and ten points in 1959. In the former year a late kick for goal by ruckman Jack Richardson which would have given West the lead with only ninety seconds remaining hit the post allowing Port to hold on. Later on grand final night, a group of Wests players, including Kerley, broke into the Adelaide Oval and cut down the goalpost. The post would later end up hanging over the Bar in the West Adelaide Footballers' Club.

In 1954 the club's search for a permanent home ground was solved with the founding of Richmond Oval. It was the first ground purpose built for Australian Rules Football in Australia, pre-dating the VFL's Waverley Park by twelve years. Richmond Oval was opened by long-serving member of the South Australian Legislative Council Sir Lyell McEwin on 26 April 1958. A capacity crowd saw West Adelaide christen their new home with a 12.11 (83) to 10.13 (73) win over neighbouring club West Torrens.

After finishing fourth in 1960, West Adelaide, captain-coached by Neil Kerley, won their seventh premiership in 1961, when they defeated Norwood by six goals in the Grand Final. The club would play its nemesis Port Adelaide in the 1962 grand final and once again would go down by a heartbreaking three points to the Magpies. Ken Eustice would become the club's tenth Magarey Medalist in 1962. Sensationally after taking the club to two Grand Finals and one premiership in his two years as coach of the club, Kerley was sacked as West's coach after the 1962 season. He was reluctantly replaced by longtime teammate and friend Doug Thomas, who went to the club committee before the season and unsuccessfully asked them to re-instate Kerley as captain-coach. Kerley continued on as a player in 1963 honouring his contract, but the following season he left to become captain-coach of South Adelaide, taking the Panthers from bottom in 1963 to their last SANFL Premiership to date in 1964.

Lean years
Following the 1961 premiership win and subsequent runners-up in 1962, West Adelaide would go through a very lean time. After finishing 2nd in 1962 the club lost amongst others Kerley, Eustice, Jeff Bray and Don Roach from their playing ranks leading to a lean spell for the club. After having played in thirteen finals series and six grand finals between 1946 and 1963 for two premierships (1947 and 1961), the club would only reach the finals another five times (1968 – fourth, 1969 – third, 1976 – fifth, 1977 – third and 1981 – fifth) between 1964 and 1982.

The ground record crowd for Richmond Oval was set in Round 5 of the 1969 season when 15,742 turned up to see Westies take on a Glenelg side coached by none other than Neil Kerley. Glenelg defeated the Bloods 18 18 (126) to 8.9 (57) on the day and the record crowd still stands as of 2013.

In the early 1970s, West Adelaide declined to their lowest ebb for a third of a century, finishing last in 1972 for the first time since 1936, and repeating this ignominy in 1973 and 1974. In 1970 West unearthed a young ruckman named Dexter Kennedy who made his league debut aged just 15 years, 11 months and 2 days. Kennedy would go on to play 236 games for the club between 1970 and 1982 before playing the last two seasons of his career with Port Adelaide. 1947 premiership player and nine-time premiership coach of Port Adelaide, Fos Williams began coaching the club in 1974 and after a tough start the team improved finishing sixth in 1975, fifth in 1976 and third in 1977. However, that was the high point for the Bloods during the 1970s as they fell dramatically to ninth in 1978 in what was to be Williams' last season of coaching league football before again finishing last under coach Trevor Hughes in 1979. The other great highlight for the club during the 1970s was the recruitment of Port rover Trevor Grimwood who would become the club's eleventh Magarey Medal winner in 1977.

Inconsistent but dangerous
The Bloods would continue to perform poorly as they finished second last in 1980 and Trevor Hughes was sacked following the season. Club General Manager Doug Thomas and President Bob Lee enticed 1961 premiership coach Neil Kerley away from West Torrens and back to West Adelaide in 1981 and the improvement in the team was immediate. The Bloods finished 5th in 1981, defeated in the Elimination Final by Norwood. Under Kerley players such as Roger Luders, Bruce Lindner, Ian Borchard, Peter Meuret, Geoff Morris and Mark Mickan all started to play their best football and 1982 was almost a repeat of the 1981 season. Going into the final round West were locked in a battle for the 5th and final finals spot on the ladder. However, Norwood again ended their run when they thumped the Bloods at Norwood Oval consigning West to a 6th-place finish.

The team hit its straps in the 1983 season, winning its first minor premiership since 1962 by two games from Sturt with an 18–4 record. The team finally got its revenge on Norwood when they put a severe dent in the Redlegs premiership defence with a 77-point win the 2nd Semi-final to earn a spot in their first Grand Final since 1962. The Following week Sturt defeated Norwood in the Preliminary to earn the other Grand Final berth. Westies won their eighth premiership when Kerley coached the team to a 21.16 (142) to 16.12 (108) win in the Grand Final in front of 47,129 fans at Football Park. West Adelaide had winners all over the ground but it was captain Ian Borchard who won the Jack Oatey Medal as the best player in the Grand Final while Centre half-forward Bruce Lindner with 5 goals and Full-forward Roger Luders kicked 4. Lindner's fifth goal was the last of the game, a 65-metre kick on the full from inside the centre square only seconds before the game ended.

Two of Wests best players throughout the 1983 season were unlucky to miss a place in the Grand Final team. Ruckman Mark Mickan, the clubs Best & Fairest for the year, ruptured his Posterior cruciate ligament in the teams 93-point win over Woodville at Football Park in Round 20 and missed the remainder of the season, while Roger Winter, twin brother of Grand Final back pocket player Peter Winter, was injured in the 2nd Semi against Norwood and could not recover in time to take his place in the side. Mickan's place was taken by 6'7" (200 cm) tall Dirk de Jong who had actually retired from league football one game into the season, but was persuaded by Kerley to come back following Mickan's injury. Despite some impressive performances in his final four games, including out playing experienced Sturt ruckman Frank Spiel in the Grand Final, de Jong, who started his SANFL career with Wests in 1978, again retired from football after 1983 having played 53 games for the club.

Roger Luders created history in 1983 when he became the first West Adelaide player to ever kick 100 goals in an SANFL season, finishing with 105 goals from 24 games played. Luders kicked 94 goals in the 22 game minor round and with the 6th of his 7 goals in the 2nd Semi-final against Norwood he kicked his 100th for the season. Luders remains the club's all-time leading goal kicker with 558 goals kicked in 162 games played between 1978 and 1986 at an average of 3.4 goals per game. Luders tally of 558 goals places him 14th on the list of all-time SANFL goal kickers. During his career Luders was known as one of the most spectacular high marking full-forwards in the SANFL

In 1985 Grantley Fielke, a premiership player from 1983, would become the club's twelfth Magarey Medal winner. West Adelaide, coached by Port Adelaide premiership player and coach John Cahill (nephew of former West coach Laurie Cahill) finished 3rd in the 1985 SANFL season, missing out on a grand final spot by less than 2 goals to North Adelaide in the Preliminary Final.

In 1991, the formation of the Adelaide Football Club, South Australia's first team in the Australian Football League (formerly the VFL) saw a number of Wests players signed by the new team. Bloods players such as Grantley Fielke, Paul Patterson, and two young guns in Tony Modra and Shaun Rehn were signed to play AFL football, but would still be eligible to play for West Adelaide if not selected by the Adelaide Crows. The Crows also signed former Bloods Bruce Lindner (Geelong) and Mark Mickan (Brisbane) who under the rules of the time, were automatically allocated back to their former SANFL club.

West Adelaide, which has earned a reputation amongst its fans as being "consistently inconsistent", would win through to their next grand final in 1991. After a slow start to the season under the coaching of former  (VFL) premiership player Kevin Morris, the team won nine of its last eleven games to reach the finals in fifth place. With young players such as leading goal kicker Greg Mellor, full forward Tony Modra, and best and fairest Peter Banfield playing alongside returning experienced veterans such as captain Leon Grosser (who would miss the Grand Final through injury), Glenn Goss, as well as Mickan and Lindner (who while playing for the Adelaide Crows in the AFL, had played enough games with West through the season to qualify for the finals), West easily defeated three-time defending premiers Port Adelaide by 89 points in the Elimination Final before winning the First Semi against Woodville-West Torrens (a new team formed through the merger of West Torrens and Woodville at the end of 1990) by 60.

They then defeated a determined South Adelaide by 21 points in the Preliminary Final and would then come up against North Adelaide, a team they had not beaten since Round 17 of the 1985 season. Despite the Roosters squad having far more finals experience than West, the in-form Bloods were rated an even chance to beat the Roosters who were playing in their fifth Grand Final since 1985. In the week leading up to the match there were rumours around Adelaide that Westies were going to "go the biff" in a bid to unsettle the Roosters and in front of 39,276, the smallest SANFL Grand Final crowd since the 1950s, the game became a spiteful affair with many brawls erupting between opposing players following Norths Steven Sims knocking out Wests Matthew Simpson early in the second quarter (it was alleged after the game that Sims had hit Simpson, not to knock him out but to stop his overly close tagging of North's Darel Hart). From that point on, West tended to forget about playing football and seemed more intent on punishing Sims, who finished the game with his right eye badly swollen and requiring 5 stitches. West Adelaide may have won the fights, but North Adelaide won the football game would go on to win easily by the score of 21.22 (148) to 11.7 (73). Crows player Darel Hart (who had played 18 AFL games for Adelaide during the year but had enough SANFL games to qualify for the finals) kicked seven goals for the Roosters on his way to winning the Fos Williams Medal. Future dual Crows premiership player Shaun Rehn who had made his AFL debut during the year with the Crows missed the SANFL finals through injury.

Following the 1991 grand final Kevin Morris joined a long list of coaches sacked by the club after a dispute with the club's board. In his place for his third run as West Adelaide coach was Neil Kerley, who himself had been controversially sacked as coach of the club after taking them to the 1962 Grand Final. The club slipped to sixth in 1992 and a disappointing eighth in 1993, ahead of perennial wooden spooners Sturt by only a small percentage gap. Following the 1993 season, Kerley was not retained and he was replaced by 220 game player Geoff Morris who led the team to second last in 1994, but improved to fifth in 1995. In 1995 Glenn Kilpatrick became West's thirteenth Magarey Medalist when he jointly won the award with Norwood legend Garry McIntosh. Former Norwood premiership player and Crows assistant coach Michael Taylor replaced Morris in 1996 and West would reach a best of third in 1998 before losing to Port Adelaide in the Preliminary final. Full-forward Adam Richardson became the first West Adelaide player since Ron Phipps in 1957 to lead the SANFL in goal kicking when he kicked 80 in the regular season and five in the finals to finish with 85 for the season and win the Ken Farmer Medal.

After missing the finals in 1999 and 2000, for 2001 West Adelaide hired former premiership captain and best and fairest winner Ian Borchard as coach. Borchard led the Bloods back to the finals in 2001 and 2002, but they lost the Elimination Final each time. Former West Adelaide junior and dual Adelaide Crows premiership player Shaun Rehn replaced Borchard in 2003 and led the club to a Grand Final for only the third time in 41 years. Facing a red-hot Central District team aiming for their third premiership in four years, West went down 17.9 (111) to 11.11 (77) in front of 28,199 at AAMI Stadium in the Grand Final. Darren Bradshaw won the Ken Farmer Medal as the SANFL's leading goal kicker in 2003, kicking 88 for the season. He added another nine goals in the finals to finish on 97 for the year.

Abrupt decline and revival
Once again West Adelaide failed to follow up its good form from the previous season and while still managing to qualify for the finals in 2004 had to be satisfied with just a fifth-placed finish. Things went from bad to worse for the club in 2005 when the team finished with the wooden spoon for the first time since 1979. Following such a dramatic drop in form, Rehn resigned as coach following the 2005 season and was replaced by former Crows teammate Wayne Weidemann for both 2006 and 2007. Despite West Adelaide playing their 400th game at Richmond Oval when they faced Sturt on 7 April 2006, neither season would bring any joy for The Bloods or their supporters as they finished with the wooden spoon in each season. Not surprisingly, Weidemann was replaced as coach following the 2007 season.

Weidemenn's replacement was former Hawthorn (AFL) premiership player from 1991 Andrew Collins. However, Collins could not improve the results in 2008 and the club finished with an unwanted fourth wooden spoon in a row, an ignominy suffered previously by Sturt (1989 to 1996), Woodville (1980 to 1985), South Adelaide (1926 to 1929), Glenelg (1937 to 1940 and 1921 to 1925) and Norwood (1913 to 1919), but never despite several bleak eras by the Bloods. Strong recruiting helped the team improve to sixth in 2009 while James Ezard, nephew of 1984 and 1985 Essendon premiership player Alan Ezard, jointly won the Magarey Medal with North Adelaide's Rhys Archard, becoming the fourteenth West Adelaide player to win the award.

Westies again finished sixth in 2010, missing the major round for the sixth straight year. In a major development for the club, lights for night games were installed at Richmond Oval (now called City Mazda Stadium under a sponsorship deal) in 2010 and Friday night games became a success with 6,133 fans attending The Bloods first ever home game under lights against North Adelaide on 26 March.

Despite winning their last game of the season at home against Sturt, West missed the SANFL Finals for the seventh straight season finishing third last with an 8–12 record. West Adelaide started the season well with a 5–1 record but injuries to key players plus general poor form saw the Bloods lose seven games in a row mid-season. Early in the 2011 season coach Andrew Collins had his contract extended for a further two years tying him to the club until 2013.

2012 finally saw the work of Andy Collins and his staff finally come to fruition with the Bloods finishing the minor round in third place with a 12–8 record, including being only one of two sides to beat runaway minor premiers Norwood. Collins was criticised in the media for resting his "star" players over the final three rounds after West had already been assured of third place and the "double chance" in the finals. The Bloods got some revenge for their 2003 Grand Final loss to Centrals with a 27-point win in the Qualifying final to book a place against Norwood in the Second Semi-final. However, Norwood's defensive game held them to just two goal in the final, the Redlegs easily booking a place in the 2012 Grand Final, winning 8.13 (61) to 2.5 (17). West bounced back a week later to record a 13.10 (88) to 10.7 (67) win over North Adelaide in the Preliminary Final to book a place in their seventeenth SANFL Grand Final, and their first against Norwood since the Bloods 1961 premiership. However, Norwood's impregnable defence won out again, and the Bloods were in danger of equalling North Adelaide's 1989 ignominy of kicking only one goal in a Grand Final before two late goals in time-on of the last quarter saw then go down 12.7 (79) to 3.12 (30).

2013 Saw West Adelaide consolidate itself as a finals campaigner, finishing the minor round in second place again behind Norwood. However, a second straight Grand Final appearance went begging when North Adelaide reversed the previous years result and booked a place in the GF against Norwood (who would win their second straight flag), leaving The Bloods to finish in third place wondering what might have been.

During 2013, the club won its first competition since winning the 1987 Foundation Cup (SANFL pre-season) when they won the 2013 Foxtel Cup, defeating WAFL side East Fremantle 4.8 (32) to 2.16 (28) at Football Park, a win worth A$100,000 in prizemoney to the club. West held a 25-point lead over the Sharks at halftime by keeping them goalless, but were themselves kept goalless in the second half scoring only three points. Helped by poor kicking for goal by the Perth based club who could only manage 2.12 (24) for the second half, West Adelaide held on for a hard-fought four-point win.

At years End, Ryan Ferguson retired returning home to Victoria. CEO Kym Russell also ended his association with the club while Coach Andrew Collins won a job at Williamstown Football Club. With Collins departing for Williamstown in the VFL, and club captain Ryan Ferguson following him, West Adelaide appointed club Hall of Famer Mark Mickan as its head coach for the 2014 season. Mickan has appointed co-club Best & Fairest winner from 2013 Chris Schmidt as the new captain.

In 2015, West Adelaide broke a 32-year premiership drought, beating Woodville-West Torrens by 30 points in the 2015 IGA SANFL grand final.
The following year 2016 it again collected the wooden spoon which it has repeated in the last 3 consecutive seasons 2019-2021.

West Adelaide were a foundation member of the SANFL Women's competition in 2017.

Current playing list

Home grounds

Kensington Oval (1897)
Jubilee Oval (1898–1906)
Adelaide Oval (1907–1926, 1940–1957)
Wayville Showgrounds (1927–1939)
Richmond Oval (Hisense Stadium) (1958–present)

The West Adelaide Football Club had no home ground to call their own until the planning and building of Richmond Oval in the early 1950s. The ground was used for training and junior games until it was ready for league use in 1958. The Bloods christened their first game at Richmond by defeating neighbouring club West Torrens by 10 points 12.11 (83) to 10.13 (73) in front of just over 15,000 fans. Such was the success of Richmond Oval that the SANFL moved its traditional ANZAC Day match from the Adelaide Oval to Richmond in 1958 where West Adelaide defeated their long-time Grand Final tormentor Port Adelaide in one of the highest profile matches ever to be played at the ground.

Thanks to the tireless efforts of people like club captain Brian Faeshe (who ironically never got to play on the ground having retired in 1956), Cliff Semmler, Roy Charles, Cliff Todd and City of West Torrens Mayor Steve Hamra, The Bloods finally had a home ground to call their own. In the 2000s the grandstand at the oval was named the B. K. Faeshe Stand in honor of the former champion player, coach and administrator of the club. Brian Faeshe was one of the driving forces in the formation of Richmond Oval while still a player with West Adelaide.

Prior to the opening of Richmond Oval West Adelaide had used the Kensington Oval (1897), Jubilee Oval (1898–1906) and the Adelaide Oval (1907–1926) for its "home" games before gaining exclusive SANFL use of the main arena at the Wayville Showgrounds in 1927, the year of their fifth SANFL Premiership. The club used the showgrounds until the end of 1939 when it was taken over by the Australian Army following the outbreak of World War II. West then went back to the Adelaide Oval for its home games from 1940 until 1957, sharing the ground with South Adelaide. For both stints at the Adelaide Oval, this created problems because during the football season Souths, being the main tenant, had first use of the oval (league) and the Adelaide Oval No. 2 (reserves) for training purposes with Westies often having to train in the Adelaide Park Lands until Richmond became available for training from 1955.

Prior to the 2010 SANFL season West Adelaide installed lights at Richmond Oval for night games. The lights have seen an increase of attendances at the ground with the first game under lights attracting the grounds current record night crowd of 6,133 for the opening game of the season with West defeating North Adelaide 14.19 (103) to 4.7 (31).

The record attendance for a West Adelaide home game was set at Richmond Oval in 1969 when 15,742 attended the Round 5 fixture against Glenelg.

Richmond Oval hosted its first Interstate game in 2013 when South Australia defeated Qld/NT (NEAFL north) 21.14 (140) to 9.4 (58).

In front of 8,765 fans, the Crows defeated Port Adelaide 0.18.11 (119) to 0.9.5 (59). The oval received over A$300,000 from the AFL for upgrades to the ground, including improved interchange area and coaches boxes, new goal and point posts and new grass.

Club achievements

Magarey Medallists

The Magarey Medal is awarded to the fairest and most brilliant player in the SANFL.
Men's League

League top goalkickers

The Ken Farmer Medal is awarded to the SANFL's leading goalkicker at the end of the minor round.

Jack Oatey Medallists

The Jack Oatey Medal is awarded to the best player of the SANFL Grand Final

Fos Williams Medallists

The Fos Williams Medal is awarded to the best SANFL player in an interstate game.

* 1988 and 1996 matches were under State of Origin rules. At the time, Mark Mickan and Tony Modra were playing for VFL/AFL clubs the Brisbane Bears and Adelaide Crows respectively and not West Adelaide.♦ Donates state league match.

Honour Board 1945–2023

Best & Fairest winners at West Adelaide are awarded the Neil Kerley Medal

Hall of Fame
West Adelaide's Hall of Fame includes:

Ron Benton
Ian Borchard
Jeff Bray
Colin Brown
John Broadstock
Jos Dailey
Robert Day
W. H. "Shrimp" Dowling
Ken Eglington
Brian Faehse (Legend)
Grantley Fielke(Legend)
Leon Grosser
H R "Dick" Head
Anthony "Tony" Kenny
Neil Kerley (Legend)
Dexter Kennedy
Bob Lee
Bruce Lindner
Bob Loveday
Roger Luders
Jack Lynch
Bruce McGregor
Robin McKinnon
Peter Meuret
Mark Mickan
Geoff Morris
Rodney Pope
Don Roach
Cliff Semmler
Bernie Smith
Colin Smith
Johnny Taylor
Doug Thomas
Fred Winter
Jimmy Wright

Club records
South Australian Premiers: 9 – 1908, 1909, 1911, 1912, 1927, 1947, 1961, 1983, 2015
Runners-up: 9 – 1922, 1954, 1956, 1958, 1959, 1962, 1991, 2003, 2012
Champions of Australia: 2 – 1908, 1911
Foxtel Cup Champions: 1 – 2013
South Australian Night Series Champions: 6 – 1955, 1957, 1960, 1962, 1985, 1987
Home ground: Richmond Oval (Hisense Stadium) (1958–present)
Previous grounds: Kensington Oval (1897), Jubilee Oval (1898–1906), Adelaide Oval (1907–1926, 1940–1957), Wayville Showgrounds (1927–1939)
First Game at Richmond Oval: 12.11 (83) d. West Torrens 10.13 (73) in 1958
Record Attendance at Hisense Stadium: 15,742 v Glenelg in Round 5, 1969
Record Night Attendance at Hisense Stadium: 6,133 v North Adelaide on 26 March 2010
Record Attendance: 54,282 v Port Adelaide at Adelaide Oval, 1958 SANFL Grand Final
Record Attendance at Football Park: 47,129 v Sturt, 1983 SANFL Grand Final
Record Attendance since Adelaide Crows (AFL) formation (1991): 39,276 v North Adelaide at Football Park, 1991 SANFL Grand Final
Record Attendance since Port Adelaide (AFL) entry (1997): 29,661 v Norwood at AAMI Stadium, 2012 SANFL Grand Final
Most Games: 327 by Grantley Fielke (1979–86, 1988–90, 1992–97) 
Most Goals in a Season: 105 by Roger Luders in 1983 (24 games)
Most Goals for the Club: 506 by Roger Luders 1978–87 (144 games)
First player to kick 100 goals in an SANFL season: Roger Luders (1983; 105 goals)
Most Years as Coach: 8 by Bruce McGregor (1926–29, 1937–39, 1941) and Neil Kerley (1961–62, 1981–84, 1992–93)
Most Premierships as Coach: 2 by Neil Kerley (1961, 1983)
Most Years as Captain: 7 by Bob Loveday (1971–72, 1974–78)
Most Premierships as Captain: 2 by Bernie Leahy (1908, 1909) and Jos Dailey (1911, 1912)
Most Premierships as a Player: 4 by Jos Dailey, W. Dowling, H. R. Head, J. J. McCarthy and T. Moore (1908, 1909, 1911, 1912)
Most Best & Fairest Awards*: 4 by Neil Kerley (1958, 1959, 1961, 1962), Mark Mickan (1983, 1985, 1986, 1993) and Ryan Ferguson (2008, 2009, 2012, 2013)
All-Australians: Jack Lynch (1953), Stan Costello (1956), Neil Kerley (1961), Don Roach (1961), Robert Day (1966), Geoff Morris (1979), Craig Williams (1983)
Highest Score: 36.21 (237) v West Torrens 16.5 (101) at Richmond Oval in Round 8, 1982
* Bruce McGregor is believed to have won 6 Best All-Round Player awards before the B&F was first awarded in 1945

1983 premiership side 
West Adelaide 21.16 (142) defeated Sturt 16.12 (108)
Venue: Football Park
Attendance: 47,129
Umpires: Laurie Argent and Rick Kinnear
Jack Oatey Medallist: Ian Borchard

Best: Borchard, Morris, Bennett, Meuret, Grosser, McKinnon, Kantilaftas, McKinnon, Burgess, Winter
Goals: Lindner 5, Luders & Grosser 4, Meuret 3, Morris 2, Conlen, Smith & Borchard 1

2015 premiership side 
West Adelaide 11.12 (78) defeated Woodville West Torrens 7.6 (48)
Venue: Adelaide Oval
Attendance: 25,625
Umpires: Tobias Medlin, Craig Fleer and Leigh Haussen
Jack Oatey Medallist: Chris Schmidt

Best: Schmidt, Porplyzia, Stevens, Schiller, Tuck, Helbig
Goals: Green 3, Beech & Webb 2, Fielke, Stevens, Tuck & Wasley-Black 1

Club song
Sung to the tune of The Yankee Doodle Boy.

We’re a happy team at Westies,
We’re the mighty fighting Bloods,
We love our club and we play to win,
Riding the bumps with a grin,

''At Westies''

Come what may you’ll find us striving,
Team work is the thing that counts,
All for one and one for all,
The way we play at Westies
We are the mighty fighting Blood and tars!

See also "West Adelaide Football Rally" (?date) by Reginald A A Stoneham (1895–1942)

AFL/VFL players (including Rookies)
There is a list of past and present West Adelaide players who have played at AFL/VFL:

 Ron Andrews (Essendon and Collingwood)
 Brett Backwell (Carlton)
 Peter Banfield (Essendon and Brisbane Lions)
 Anthony Banik (Richmond)
 Shane Birss (Western Bulldogs and St. Kilda)
 Riley Bonner (Port Adelaide)
 Ian Borchard (Richmond)
 Darren Bradshaw (Brisbane Lions)
 Jeff Bray (1938–2006) (South Melbourne)
 Jeff Broadstock (1920–1995) (Richmond)
 Kaiden Brand - 
 Nathan Brown (Melbourne)
 George Bruce (1879–1928) (Carlton)
 Les Bryant (1896–1965) (Fitzroy)
 Tony Burgess (Collingwood)
 Darren Carlson (Brisbane Bears)
 Domenic Cassisi (Port Adelaide)
 Bernie Conlen (South Melbourne)
 Adam Cooney (Western Bulldogs and Essendon)
 Brad Crouch (Adelaide)
 Damian Cupido (Brisbane Lions and Essendon)
Mitch Robinson (Carlton)
 Patrick Dangerfield (Adelaide and Geelong)
 Jason Davenport (Port Adelaide)
 Brad Davis (Fitzroy)
 Robert Day - 
 Will Day - 
 Mark Dreher (Collingwood)
 Nathan Eagleton (Port Adelaide and Western Bulldogs)
 Tyson Edwards (Adelaide)
 James Ezard (Port Adelaide)
 Bob Farmer (Collingwood)
 Ryan Ferguson (Melbourne)
 Grantley Fielke (Collingwood and Adelaide)
 Sam Fisher (St. Kilda)
 Aaron Francis (Essendon)
 Robbie Gray (Port Adelaide)
 Steven Hamilton (North Melbourne)
 Merv Harbinson (Essendon)
 Tom Hart (1896–1971) (Carlton)
 Adam Hartlett (Carlton)
 Hamish Hartlett (Port Adelaide)

 Brad Helbig (Richmond)
 Carl Herbert (Collingwood)
 Des Herbert (Collingwood and Fitzroy)
 Eddie Hocking (Adelaide)
 Ben Hollands (Richmond)
 Greg Hollick (Richmond)
 Harry House (1919–2006) (St. Kilda)
 Darryl Hewitt (St. Kilda)
 Glynn Hewitt (Richmond)
 Dean Howard (Adelaide)
 Bill Hudson (1920–1945) (St. Kilda)
 Luke Jericho (Adelaide)
 Bert Johnson (North Melbourne)
 Bob Keddie (Hawthorn)
 Michael Kennedy (Brisbane Bears)
 Glenn Kilpatrick (Essendon and Geelong)
 Rory Laird (Adelaide)
 Clayton Lamb (Adelaide)
 Bruce Lindner (Geelong and Adelaide)
 Matthew Lobbe (Port Adelaide)
 Joe Lukeman (1901–1993) (Footscray)
 Ben Marsh (Adelaide and Richmond)
 Mark Mickan (Brisbane Bears and Adelaide)
 Neville Miller (South Melbourne)
 Riley Milne (Hawthorn)
 Tony Modra (Adelaide and Fremantle)
 Harry Morgan (1889–1956) (South Melbourne and Carlton)
 Steven Morris (Richmond)
 Marlon Motlop (Port Adelaide)
 Damien Murray (North Melbourne)
 Matthew Nicks (Sydney Swans)
 Luke Norman (Melbourne)
 Seff Parry (1907–1980) (Fitzroy)
 Paul Patterson (Adelaide)
 Michael Pettigrew (Port Adelaide)
 Jason Porplyzia (Adelaide)
 Bert Rapiport (1865–1913) (Fitzroy)
 Shaun Rehn (Adelaide and Hawthorn)
 Mark Ricciuto (Adelaide)
 Adam Richardson (Adelaide)
 Don Roach (1940–2011) (Hawthorn)
 Lachlan Ross (Essendon)
 Sean Rusling (Collingwood)
 Jordan Russell (Carlton and Collingwood)

 Ben Rutten (Adelaide)
 Byron Schammer (Fremantle)
 Chris Schmidt (Brisbane Lions and Adelaide)
 Tim Schmidt (Sydney Swans)
 Jack Sexton (1900–1935) (Fitzroy)
 Neville Shaw (Collingwood)
 Jarrod Silvester (Richmond)
 Matthew Simpson (Brisbane Bears)
 Henry Slattery (Essendon)
 Tyson Slattery (Essendon)
 Bernie Smith (1927–1985) (Geelong)
 Jesse D. Smith (Carlton)
 Michael Smith (South Melbourne)
 Roy Snell (1901–1977) (Fitzroy)
 Will Snelling (Port Adelaide and Essendon)
 Kieran Sporn (Essendon and Fitzroy)
 Rhys Stanley (St. Kilda and Geelong)
 Bruce Stevenson (Hawthorn)
 Don Taylor (1920–1994) (South Melbourne)
 Laurie Taylor (1918–1980) (Richmond)
 Les Thomas (1906–1997) (Collingwood)
 Stephen Tiller (Western Bulldogs)
 Joel Tippett (Gold Coast and North Melbourne)
 Kurt Tippett (Adelaide and Sydney Swans)
 Gerard Toohey (Geelong)
 Shane Tuck (1981–2020) (Richmond)
 Travis Tuck (Hawthorn)
 Gary Wallis (Collingwood and St. Kilda)
 Peter Walsh (Melbourne and Port Adelaide)
 Larry Weideman (Essendon and Fitzroy)
 Mark Weideman (Collingwood)
 Beau Waters (West Coast Eagles)
 Scott Welsh (North Melbourne/Kangaroos, Adelaide and Western Bulldogs)
 Darren Wheildon (Fitzroy)
 Brent Williams (Adelaide)
 Craig Williams (St. Kilda)
 Mark Williams (Collingwood and Brisbane Bears)
 Ryan Willits (Port Adelaide)
 Cameron Wood (Brisbane Lions, Collingwood and Carlton)
 Dale Woodhall (Collingwood)
 Alby Yeo (Essendon)

Influence and supporters

The black and red colours of West End beer made by the South Australian Brewing Company came about after West Adelaide defeated Port Adelaide in the 1911 Grand Final, and defeated VFL premiers Essendon in the Championship of Australia play-off at Adelaide Oval shortly afterwards in the same year.

Despite the SANFL being a localised league, West Adelaide have some high-profile Adelaide personalities as supporters of the club. Former Premier of South Australia (1996–2001) John Olsen AO, the current SANFL President and Chairman of the SA Football Commission, and former South Australian Sheffield Shield cricketer and SANFL umpire turned Adelaide television and radio personality K. G. Cunningham, are known to be proud Bloods fans.

References

Miscellaneous
A song written dedicated to the West Adelaide Team by Reg Stoneham 1911. Scan of the sheet music

External links

 
History of the West Adelaide Football Club from Australian Football.com
 A Forum for Fans of the Mighty Bloods
Bloods, Sweat & Tears – Merv Agars (1987)
 Legends of SANFL
1908 Premiership Coach John Cole Reedman
Photos of Richmond Oval
Jubilee Oval

South Australian National Football League clubs
SANFL Women's League
Australian rules football clubs in South Australia
1892 establishments in Australia
Australian rules football clubs established in 1892